Kathangari is a village in Udham Singh Nagar district in the state of Uttrakhand, India, 10km from Sitarganj, 20 km from Kichha and 34km from Rudrapur, on the Sitarganj - Kichha National Highway 74. In the 2011 census of India, kathangari had a population of 896 people (470 males; 426 females).

References

Villages in Udham Singh Nagar district